Dato' Seri Aminuddin bin Harun (Jawi: أمين الدين بن هارون; born 2 January 1967) is a Malaysian politician who has served as the 11th Menteri Besar of Negeri Sembilan since May 2018 and Member of the Negeri Sembilan State Legislative Assembly (MLA) for Sikamat since March 2008. He is a member of the People's Justice Party (PKR), a component party of the Pakatan Harapan (PH) coalition. He has served as Vice President of PKR since July 2022 and is also State Chairman of PH and PKR of Negeri Sembilan.

Political career
Prior to joining PKR in 1999, he was a member of United Malays National Organisation (UMNO) and has been its secretary for Kampung Pachitan division from 1995 to 1998. He was also the secretary for Umno Youth Jimah division for two years, 1997 until 1998.

Aminuddin has submitted a letter endorsed by PKR chief Wan Azizah Wan Ismail to the Negeri Sembilan DYMM Yamtuan Besar as the next YAB Menteri Besar of Negeri Sembilan after PH gained the majority of State Legislative Assembly in the 2018 general election to form the new state government. He was sworn in as the YAB Menteri Besar of Negeri Sembilan on 12 May 2018 at the Istana Besar Seri Menanti in Kuala Pilah.

Election results

Honours
  :
  Knight Grand Companion of the Order of Loyalty to Negeri Sembilan (SSNS) – Dato' Seri (2019)

See also

 Sikamat (state constituency)

References

External links
 

Living people
1967 births
People from Negeri Sembilan
Malaysian people of Malay descent
Malaysian Muslims
People's Justice Party (Malaysia) politicians
Former United Malays National Organisation politicians
Members of the Negeri Sembilan State Legislative Assembly
Negeri Sembilan state executive councillors
Chief Ministers of Negeri Sembilan
21st-century Malaysian politicians